This was the first edition of the tournament.

Aljaž Bedene won the title after defeating Benoît Paire 6–2, 6–2 in the final.

Seeds

Draw

Finals

Top half

Bottom half

References
Main Draw
Qualifying Draw

Verrazzano Open - Singles